Carl August Rohde (29 September 1910 – 14 May 1959) was an Australian rules footballer who played with Hawthorn in the Victorian Football League (VFL).

Family
The son of August Ashley Rohde, and Jane Rohde, née Gouge, Carl August Rohde was born at Avoca, Victoria on 29 September 1910.

He married Elsie Jean Statham (1917-1969) in 1940.

Death
He died in Bendigo, Victoria on 14 May 1959.

Notes

References
 
 Last-Minute Clearances, The Argus, (Saturday, 27 April 1935), p.26.
 At Hawthorn, The Argus, (Wednesday, 28 April 1937), p.17.
 Civil Constructional Corps (Victoria) Registration: Carl August Rohde (CV38268), National Archives of Australia.

External links 

1910 births
1959 deaths
Australian rules footballers from Victoria (Australia)
Hawthorn Football Club players